NGC 7531 is an intermediate spiral galaxy located in the constellation Grus. It is located at a distance of circa 70 million light-years from Earth, which, given its apparent dimensions, means that NGC 7531 is about 95,000 light years across. It was discovered by John Herschel on September 2, 1836.

Characteristics 
The inner region of NGC 7531 is characterised by a high surface brightness ring. The ring is a place of active star formation and a number of star clusters and H II regions have been identified in it. A weak bar is observed in the near infrared inside the ring, along with dust lanes. Yet, the motions at the inner ring are predominately circular. The inner ring may lie at the location of the inner Lindblad resonance. 

The galaxy has two patchy spiral arms that are relatively well defined but are of low surface brightness. H II regions have also been observed at the spiral arms of the galaxy, where there is also active star formation, which is more intense at the southwest region. A supermassive black hole is believed to lie in the centre of the galaxy whose mass is estimated to be 3–48 million (107.07±0.61) , based on the spiral arm pitch angle. The galaxy is seen with an inclination of 66°.

One supernova has been observed in NGC 7531, SN 2012dj. It was a type Ib/c supernova with a peak magnitude of 15.3.

Nearby galaxies 
In long exposure photographic plates of the galaxy, a large low surface brightness region structure was observed 2.6 arcminutes west from the nucleus of the galaxy, that has more than half the apparent diameter of NGC 7531. It has been identified as a stellar cloud that may be a dwarf satellite of the galaxy or a shell created by the tidal disruption of NGC 7531.

NGC 7531 is a member of the NGC 7582 galaxy group. Other members of the group include NGC 7552, NGC 7582, NGC 7590, and NGC 7599, which are also known as the Grus Quartet, NGC 7496, NGC 7632, and IC 5325. This group, along with the group centred around IC 1459 form the Grus cloud, a region of elevated galaxy density. The Grus cloud, along with the nearby Pavo-Indus cloud, lies between the Local Supercluster and Pavo–Indus Supercluster.

See also 
 NGC 4622, and NGC 5364 - two similar spiral galaxies with inner rings
 Messier 94 - spiral galaxy with a similar inner ring

References

External links 

NGC 7531 on SIMBAD

Intermediate spiral galaxies
Grus (constellation)
7531
70800
Discoveries by John Herschel
Astronomical objects discovered in 1836